Trident Trikes is a manufacturer of recumbent tricycles, based in Lincolnton, North Carolina, United States.

Models
As of December 2021, Trident's product lineup includes mostly tadpole trikes,

with two front wheels and one rear wheel. Despite their trademarked motto "3 wheels good... 2 wheels bad!",

they do offer the T.W.I.G as a 2 wheel recumbent. Some models are available with electric (E) assist options.

 Chameleon Convertitrike Tandem/Single
 Stowaway I & II 
 Spike 1, 2 & 380 (E)
 Transport 20 & 26 
 Trekker 20 & 26 Hidden Suspension
 Fat Trekker 20/26 Suspension (E)
 Terrain 20 & 26 Fat Tire (E) 
 E Titan (E)
 T.W.I.G (Two Wheels IS Good) 2 wheel

See also
List of bicycle manufacturers

References

External links
 
 

Tricycles
Cycle manufacturers of the United States